Sverre Udnæs (20 September 1939 – 27 August 1982) was a Norwegian playwright,  dramatist, director and stage producer. He directed a wide range of performances for both television and theater and served as an artistic adviser for the National Theater (Nationaltheatret).

Biography
Udnæs was born in Oslo, Norway. He was the  son of Hans Udnæs (1892–1973) and Astrid Wium (1903–96).  He was educated at the Oslo Cathedral School. In 1960, he got a job at the Norwegian Broadcasting Corporation (NRK).  In 1963 he became a producer for NRK and in 1967 director. He wrote and produced for radio and television, in particular at Radioteatret and Fjernsynsteatret.

From 1978 he was an artistic advisor and director at Nationaltheatret. His plays were staged at various theatres, including Nationaltheatret, Det Norske Teatret  and  Oslo Nye Teater. His play I dette hvite lyset from 1976 was basis for the 1977 drama film Øyeblikket.

References

1939 births
1982 deaths
Theatre people from Oslo
People educated at Oslo Cathedral School
NRK people
20th-century Norwegian dramatists and playwrights
20th-century Norwegian male writers
Norwegian theatre directors
Burials at the Cemetery of Our Saviour
Norwegian male dramatists and playwrights